Calvin Jones (2 April 1775 – 20 September 1846) was a North Carolina physician and was among the group of founders of the North Carolina Medical Society. He served from 1802 to 1832 as a trustee of the University of North Carolina.  Jones was also elected to the North Carolina House of Commons (from Johnston County in 1799 and 1802, and from Wake County in 1807) and as the Mayor (then called Intendant of Police) of Raleigh, North Carolina (1807–1809). In 1817 and 1819 he was Grand Master of Masons in North Carolina.

Jones served as adjutant general of the state militia during the period of the War of 1812 and claimed to know Andrew Jackson and Jackson's wife "very well personally" in a letter he wrote to a cousin in 1828.

Early career 
Calvin Jones was born on 2 April 1775 in Great Barrington, Massachusetts, to Ebenezer and Susannah (Blackmore) Jones.  His father was a soldier in the American Revolution.  He received his medical license in 1792, and then moved to Smithfield, North Carolina in 1795.

Jones was elected to the North Carolina House of Commons twice from Johnston County, once in 1799 and again in 1802.  He was the first physician in North Carolina to practice the inoculation of smallpox.  He helped found the North Carolina Medical Society in 1799.

He was a trustee of the University of North Carolina for thirty years between 1802 and 1832.

In 1803, Jones moved from Smithfield to Raleigh. He served in the House of Commons for Wake County in 1807, and was elected Intendant of Police of Raleigh the same year.

In 1808, Jones became an editor with the Raleigh Star, an early local newspaper.  He sold his shares to his partner, Thomas Henderson, in 1815.

Military service 
In 1798, Jones served in the Johnston County regiment of the North Carolina militia.  His regiment received a signed letter from President John Adams in 1798, thanking them for their preparedness to serve during the Quasi-War.

After the Chesapeake–Leopard affair in 1807, President Thomas Jefferson called for 7,003 troops from North Carolina.  Jones, now a captain, organized the Wake Troop of Cavalry.  After the troops were deemed unnecessary, Jones continued to train them.  His efforts were recognized when he was appointed adjutant general of North Carolina in 1808.

After the War of 1812 broke out, Jones resigned from his position to become Major General of the Seventh North Carolina District of Militia.  The British landed at Ocracoke and Portsmouth with a 74-gun man-of-war, six frigates, two privateers, two schooners, and up to 70 smaller vessels in 1813.  He and his troops showed enough force to send the British off after five days of raids.

Later life
In 1820, Jones relocated out of Raleigh to what is now Wake Forest, to a  plantation which later gave its name to the surrounding town. He was postmaster of the small village that soon surrounded his land. The property was purchased by the North Carolina Baptist Convention in 1832 and became the first home of Wake Forest College. Wake Forest was part of an envisioned network of plantations across the South, including his second farm in Bolivar, Tennessee, named "Pontine", supposedly for the Pontine Marshes near Rome, or perhaps, for the pons network of the brain, representing his idea of network of plantations.  After the sale of Wake Forest, Jones moved to Bolivar, where he died in 1846.

Family and legacy 
Jones was first engaged to Ruina J. Williams, daughter of Major William Williams of Franklin County. Ten years after she died in 1809, Jones married her sister, Temperance Boddie Jones, widow of Thomas Jones of Warrenton.  Their children were:

 Montezuma Jones (1819 – 1922), married Elizabeth Wood.
 Octavia Rowena Jones (1826 – 1917), married Edwin Polk.
 Paul Tudor Jones (1828 – 1904), married first Jane M. Wood and second Mary Kirkman.

Of the known portraits of Jones, one is held at the Historical House and the other is in Dallas with his descendants.

The main dwelling on his Wake Forest plantation, built circa 1820, is now a museum for the Wake Forest College Birthplace Society.  The museum is known as the Dr. Calvin Jones House, and features exhibits about the history of Wake Forest College and the town of Wake Forest, including the Wake Forest College Sports Hall of Fame.  The Society also maintains historic archives about the college and town that are available to researchers by appointment. In 2016, the house was listed on the National Register of Historic Places.

A highway in the Wake Forest area, the N.C. 98 Bypass, was renamed in his honor in 2010.

References

External links
Wake Forest Historical Museum

1775 births
1846 deaths
Adjutants General of North Carolina
Physicians from North Carolina
People from Wake Forest, North Carolina
Mayors of Raleigh, North Carolina
Members of the North Carolina House of Representatives
People from Bolivar, Tennessee